Toomas Vanem (born 8 June 1965 in Estonia) is an Estonian guitarist and composer. He started his music career in the 1980s. He has played in multiple Estonian rock bands such as
Radar, Kontakt, Linnu Tee, Shower etc. In 1987-1991 Vanem played guitar for Russian rock group Dialog. In 1995, Toomas Vanem together with his brother Ivo Vanem, composed the music for the film ’’Ma olen väsinud vihkamast’’(’’Too Tired to Hate’’).  In 2014 Toomas Vanem released his first solo album I. American bass legend Stu Hamm also appears on a track here.

Discography

I (2014, CD) Toomas Vanem productions

References

Videos

External links 
 
 

1965 births
Estonian rock guitarists
Living people
20th-century Estonian musicians
21st-century Estonian musicians